Elmdale Ward was a municipal ward in the city of Ottawa, Ontario, Canada.

The ward was created in 1929 when it was split off from Dalhousie Ward. It existed until 1994, when it was merged with Queensboro Ward to become Kitchissippi Ward. From 1952 to 1980, the ward was known as Elmdale-Victoria Ward, after Elmdale Ward merged with Victoria Ward.

Elmdale Ward originally consisted of Ottawa's western suburbs, such as Civic Hospital and Hintonburg, but was later shifted west by an expanding Dalhousie Ward to its east. As Ottawa expanded, Elmdale's western boundary became Island Park Drive.

Aldermen

Ottawa wards